The Saint-Pierre River is a tributary of the Mascouche River, flowing in the sector of "Saint-Janvier", in the city of Mirabel, in the region administrative Laurentides, in the southwest of Quebec at Canada.

This river runs eastwards an agricultural plain skirting the northern village of "Saint-Janvier".

Geography 

Saint Pierre river rises between the Highway 15 and route 117, the northwest side of the village of Saint-Janvier. This source is located at:
  north-east of the airport terminal to the Mirabel Airport;
  north-west of rivière des Mille Îles;
  west of the confluence of the Saint Pierre River.

Course of the river

 north to the bridge of the route 117;
 eastward, forming a detour to the north, up the road from "Côte Saint-Pierre";
 to the south east, to the confluence of the river

Toponymy

The place name "Rivière Saint-Pierre" is of Christian origin. Two tributaries of the north bank of the Mascouche River are designated "Saint-Pierre River."

The place name "Saint-Pierre River" was formalized on August 8, 1977 at the "Banque de noms de lieux" (Bank of place names) of Commission de toponymie du Québec (Quebec Geographical Names Board).

See also 

 Mirabel, a city
 Mascouche River, a stream
 Rivière des Mille Îles, a stream
 List of rivers of Quebec

References 

Rivers of Laurentides
Mirabel, Quebec
Tributaries of the Saint Lawrence River